Golcar railway station is a former railway station serving Golcar in West Yorkshire, England that was located between the existing Huddersfield and Slaithwaite stations. Along with several other stations on this stretch of line, it was closed to passengers on 6 October 1968 - a result of the Beeching Axe.  No trace of the station remains, though there have been calls to rebuild the station here to serve the village and also neighbouring Milnsbridge.

References

External links
 Golcar station on navigable 1947 O. S. map

Disused railway stations in Kirklees
Beeching closures in England
Former London and North Western Railway stations
Railway stations in Great Britain opened in 1849
Railway stations in Great Britain closed in 1968